Rieul (sign: ㄹ; , rieul) is a consonant of the Korean alphabet. The Unicode for ㄹ is U+3139. Rieul is pronounced [r] at the beginning of a word and [l] at the end of a word. For example: 러시아 reosia ("Russia"), 별 byeol ("star").

Stroke order

Other communicative representations

References 

Hangul jamo